Moti Malka is an Israeli footballer who plays for Hapoel Nof HaGalil.

References

1990 births
Living people
Israeli Jews
Israeli footballers
Hapoel Nof HaGalil F.C. players
Hapoel Be'er Sheva F.C. players
Hapoel Rishon LeZion F.C. players
Hapoel Marmorek F.C. players
Ironi Nesher F.C. players
Maccabi Netanya F.C. players
Hapoel Kafr Kanna F.C. players
Bnei Sakhnin F.C. players
F.C. Kafr Qasim players
Liga Leumit players
Israeli Premier League players
Footballers from Nof HaGalil
Association football forwards